St. Patrick's Parish and Buildings is a historic church on Grand Street, Ocean and Bramhall Avenues in Jersey City, Hudson County, New Jersey, United States. It was built in 1868 and added to the National Register of Historic Places in 1980. The stained glass windows in the church were destroyed in the Black Tom explosion of 1916.

The church appears in the HBO crime drama The Sopranos four times, standing in for a church in Newark in the pilot, season three's Another Toothpick, season four's Watching Too Much Television, and season six's The Ride.

See also 
 National Register of Historic Places listings in Hudson County, New Jersey
 Bergen Hill, Jersey City
St. John's Episcopal Church (Jersey City, New Jersey)

References

Churches on the National Register of Historic Places in New Jersey
Second Empire architecture in New Jersey
Gothic Revival church buildings in New Jersey
Roman Catholic churches completed in 1868
19th-century Roman Catholic church buildings in the United States
Churches in Hudson County, New Jersey
National Register of Historic Places in Hudson County, New Jersey
New Jersey Register of Historic Places
Churches in Jersey City, New Jersey